Renmin is a town under the administration of Anda, Heilongjiang, China. , it administers four residential neighborhoods and the following 11 villages:
Renmin Village
Yongsheng Village
Heli Village
Qingfeng Village
Yongping Village
Yixin Village
Yumin Village
Gongnong Village
Heping Village
Xinyi Village
Qingmin Village

References 

Township-level divisions of Heilongjiang
Anda, Heilongjiang